Roland Johansson can refer to:

 Roland Johansson (boxer), a Swedish boxer
 Roland Johansson (guitarist), a Swedish guitarist
 Roland Johansson (swimmer), a Swedish swimmer